The Bear River High School Science Building, at 1450 S. Main St. in Garland, Utah, was built as a Works Progress Administration public works project in 1935.  It was listed on the National Register of Historic Places in 1985.

It is a two-story red brick building, PWA Moderne in style.

It was one of 233 buildings built in Utah as part of similar programs.

References

Schools in Utah
PWA Moderne architecture in Utah
National Register of Historic Places in Box Elder County, Utah
Buildings and structures completed in 1935